Gary Wilkinson (born 7 April 1966) is an English former professional snooker player.

Career 
Wilkinson turned professional in 1987. In 1988, he won the non-ranking WPBSA Invitation Event beating Alex Higgins 5–4 in the final. He climbed the rankings to reach the no. 5 spot in the world within four seasons. One of his career highlights was at the 1989 UK Championship, where he led John Parrott 7–0 and 8–1 in their Last 16 match before falling over the line at 9–6, then whitewashing Jimmy White 9–0 in the quarter finals, and then leading world number 1 Steve Davis 4–0, 6–2 and 8–7 in the semi finals, before Wilkinson misread the score thinking that Davis didn't need snookers and went for a risky shot. It proved costly as Davis came back to get the snookers he needed, win that frame and then the deciding frame as Davis won 9–8. Wilkinson failed to sustain his late 1980s and early 1990s results and has never won a ranking tournament, losing in the final of the 1991 British Open 9–10 to Stephen Hendry, losing the 1992 Scottish Masters final 8–10 to Neal Foulds, as well as losing in four ranking semi-finals. While fancied to potentially go far at the 1991 World Championship, Wilkinson missed the chance of a 147 maximum break and a £100,000 prize in his first round match against Doug Mountjoy after missing the final yellow off its spot, and eventually lost 3–13 to Jimmy White in the quarter finals in a surprisingly one-sided scoreline.

Wilkinson spent a decade in the top 32, but without reaching a ranking semi-final after 1992. He has made ten appearances in the World Championship, meaning that he has come through qualifying eight times. His best runs were to the quarter-finals in 1991 and 1995. After dropping off the main tour he played in the PIOS whilst also working as a tournament assistant for World Snooker. However, Wilkinson did capture one major title when he won the 1991 World Matchplay. During this peak moment of his career in December 1991, Wilkinson defeated Dean Reynolds 5–1, world champion John Parrott 9–8, Jimmy White 9–6 and then beat Steve Davis 18–11 in the final to win the 1991 World Matchplay title and the £70,000 winner's cheque.

Performance and rankings timeline

Career finals

Ranking finals: 1

Non-ranking finals: 3 (2 titles)

Pro-am finals: 1 (1 title)

Amateur finals: 2 (1 title)

References

1966 births
English snooker players
Living people
People from Kirkby-in-Ashfield
Sportspeople from Nottinghamshire